The Iran Sanctions Enhancement Act of 2007, introduced in the United States House of Representatives by Representative Mark Kirk (R-IL) and Representative Rob Andrews (D-NJ), would have threatened sanctions against any company or individual that provided Iran with refined petroleum products or engages in an activity that could contribute to the enhancement of Iran's ability to import refined products after December 31, 2007. The bill was never voted on and died in committee.

The bill could have led to sanctions against gasoline brokers, tankers, and insurers. U.S. companies are prohibited
from trade with Iran under unilateral sanctions, but most foreign companies are free to trade with Tehran.

The United States, which was leading efforts to isolate Iran over its nuclear plans, has said Iran's gasoline imports are a point of "leverage." Washington accuses Iran of seeking to build nuclear weapons, a charge Tehran denied.

According to Mark Kirk, Americans were studying around this plan over the last five years.

Unlike other US sanctions programs, foreign subsidiary companies of U.S. companies would not have been restricted from doing business with Iran, even to the extent of supplying U.S.-origin goods to Iran.

See also
2007 Gasoline Rationing Plan in Iran
Iran Refined Petroleum Sanctions Act of 2009

References

Iran–United States relations
United States sanctions
Sanctions against Iran
Sanctions legislation
Nuclear program of Iran
Proposed legislation of the 110th United States Congress